Romeo Kastiel (born 5 May 1993) is a Surinamese footballer who plays as a forward for Inter Moengotapoe.

International career
On 29 March 2016, Kastiel made his debut for Suriname in a 2017 Caribbean Cup qualification match against Guadeloupe.

References

External links

1993 births
Living people
Association football forwards
Surinamese footballers
Sportspeople from Paramaribo
Surinamese expatriate footballers
Expatriate sportspeople in French Guiana
Inter Moengotapoe players
SVB Eerste Divisie players
Suriname international footballers